The presbylarynx  is a condition in which age-related atrophy of the soft tissues of the larynx results in weak voice and restricted vocal range and stamina. In other words, it is the loss of vocal fold tone and elasticity due to aging which affects voice quality.

Symptoms
The list of signs and symptoms mentioned in various sources for presbylarynx includes the 4 symptoms listed below: 
 Hoarseness 
 Breathy voice 
 Reduced voice volume 
 Unstable voice pitch 
Note that presbylarynx symptoms usually refers to various symptoms known to a patient, but the phrase "presbylarynx signs" may refer to those signs only noticeable by a doctor.

Treatment
The list of treatments mentioned in various sources for presbylarynx includes the following list. Always seek professional medical advice about any treatment or change in treatment plans. 
 Voice therapy

See also 

 Acoustic phonetics
 Epiglottitis
 Intubation
 Laryngitis
 Mechanical larynx
 Phonation
 Phonetics
 Vocology 
 Voice organ

References

Speech and Hearing Science: Anatomy and Physiology, 3rd edition. Willard R. Zemlin. 1988. Prentice-Hall, Inc. Englewood Cliffs, New Jersey. 

Human head and neck
Human voice
Phonetics
Larynx disorders